This is a list of Dutch exonyms for towns located in Belgium.

Amougies           Amengijs
Archennes          Eerken
Arlon		Aarlen
Ath		Aat
Bassenge		Bitsingen
Bassilly           Zullik
Bastogne		Bastenaken
Bas-Warneton	Neerwaasten
Beauvechain	Bevekom
Béclers            Beek-Laren
Bergliers          Bellik
Berneau            Bern
Bettincourt        Bettenhoven
Bierghes		Bierk
Bois-de-Lessines	Lessenbos
Bombaye		Bombeek
Braine-l'Alleud	Eigenbrakel
Braine-le-Château	Kasteelbrakel
Braine-le-Comte	´s Gravenbrakel
Clabecq            Klabbeek
Comines		Komen
Dottignies		Dottenijs
Eben-Emael		Eben-Emaal
Ellezelles		Elzele
Enghien		Edingen
Estaimbourg        Steenburg
Estaimpuis         Steenput
Flobecq		Vloesberg
Froyennes          Fraaien
Gembloux		Gembloers
Genappe            Genapiën
Ghislenghien       Gellingen
Glons		Glaaien
Goé                Gulke
Gondregnies        Gondergem
Grez-Doiceau       Graven
Hannut		Hannuit
Houtaing           Houtem
Houthem            Houtem
Herseaux	Herzeeuw
Hombourg           Homburg
Huy		Hoei
Ittre              Itter
Jauche             Geten
Jodoigne           Geldenaken
Jodoigne-Souveraine Opgeldenaken
Jurbise            Jurbeke
La Hulpe		Terhulpen
Lanaye             Ternaaien
Lessines		Lessen
Liège              Luik
Limbourg           Limburg
Lincent		Lijsem
Linsmeau		Linsmeel
Luingne            Lowingen
		Mark
Mélin		Malen
Mons		Bergen
Mouscron		Moeskroen
Namur	Namen
Nivelles		Nijvel
Oisquercq          Oostkerk
Oleye		Liek
Ollignies		Woelingen
Oreye		Oerle
Otrange		Wauteringen
Oeudeghien         Heidegem
Papignies		Papegem
Pellaines          Pellen
Perwez		Perwijs
Petit Enghien	Lettelingen
Piétrain		Petrem
Plombières         Bleiberg
Racour		Raatshoven
Rebecq-Rognon      Roosbeek
Roclenge-sur-Geer	Rukkelingen-aan-de-Jeker
Rosoux-Crenwick	Roost-Krenwik
Russeignies	Rozenaken
Saintes            Sint-Genelde
Saint Jean-Geest	Sint-Jans-Geest
Saint Rémy-Geest	Sint-Remigus-Geest
Silly              Opzullik
Soignies           Zinnik
Steenkerque        Steenkerke
Tournai		Doornik
Tourinnes-la-Grosse Deurne
Trognée		Truilingen
Tubize		Tubeke
Visé		Wezet
Waimes             Weismes
Waremme		Borgworm
Warneton		Waasten
Warsage		Weerst
Wauthier-Braine	Woutersbrakel
Wavre		Waver
Welkenraedt        Welkenraat
Wihogne		Nudorp
Zétrud-Lumay	Zittert-Lummen

See also

Dutch exonyms
List of European exonyms

Dutch language lists
Dutch
Dutch exonyms in Belgium